Zdravko Borovnica (Serbian Cyrillic: Здpaвкo Бopoвницa ;born 1954) is a Serbian former professional footballer who played as a striker or defender.

Career
Born in Nakovo, Borovnica started playing in his hometown club FK Polet Nakovo together with his younger brother Slavko. When his brother moved to OFK Kikinda, where he made most of his career, Zdravko signed with FK Proleter Zrenjanin who were desperately fighting for the return to the Yugoslav First League. Next year he went for trials in the giants Red Star Belgrade making a good impression with the coach Gojko Zec and signing a contract with them. But the beginning was hard for him, because there was already a big competition for a striker place in the team, spending most of the time on the bench. Everything changed in a UEFA Cup match against Dinamo Berlin that his team had to overcome a defeat in Berlin of 5–2, and an already conceded goal in the returning match, when the coach, now, Branko Stanković, decided to give him a chance. He would not regret it, because Borovnica ended scoring two goals and helping the team make one of the most incredible turnarounds in football history, with a final 4–1 win. Since then, Borovnica became the team joker player. In the next seasons, because Red Star had many excellent strikers, but not so many great defenders, it was decided that his characteristics would make him a good defensive player. That make him become the big, fighting, cold and rational defender that is still this days remembered. He also was excellent in taking the ball forward, making a double-pass and becoming a threat to the adversaries goals, showing that he never forgot his forward skills. He was also a terrific header. It was, non-officially, said that, since Red Star had already too many players in the national team squad, he would not have a chance to play for the Yugoslav national team. He stayed there until 1982 playing an impressive 161 official matches and scoring 24 goals.

Next he decided to go abroad, again, he had a brief spell in Australian Footscray JUST in 1977, this time to France Ligue 1 team SC Bastia where he played the 1982–83 season. Afterward, he returned to Yugoslavia where he represented a number of First League clubs, namely, Olimpija Ljubljana (1983–83), Dinamo Vinkovci ( 1984–86) and FK Sutjeska ( 1987–88).

References

External sources
 Zdravko Borovnica at Aussie Footballers
 
 Stats from Yugoslav League in Zerodic.
 

Living people
1954 births
Serbian footballers
Yugoslav footballers
Association football defenders
Association football forwards
Association football utility players
FK Proleter Zrenjanin players
Red Star Belgrade footballers
HNK Cibalia players
Yugoslav First League players
Footscray JUST players
Expatriate soccer players in Australia
National Soccer League (Australia) players
SC Bastia players
Ligue 1 players
Expatriate footballers in France
NK Olimpija Ljubljana (1945–2005) players
FK Sutjeska Nikšić players
Adanaspor footballers
Süper Lig players
Expatriate footballers in Turkey
Serbian expatriate footballers